Hans-Jürgen Baake (born 2 March 1954) is a retired German footballer.

Playing career 
Baake played for MSV Duisburg in his youth before earning his first professional contract at VfL Osnabrück in 1972 and getting promoted to the 2. Bundesliga in 1974. After his time in Lower Saxony, Baake moved to Bundesliga side Wuppertaler SV for a further two years, but was relegated after just one season. His stalwart performances attracted Tennis Borussia Berlin where he played between 1976 and 1978, making 57 appearances for the Veilchen. In 1980, Baake moved to city rivals Hertha BSC. Aged 26 and after only his seventh league game for Hertha, Baake was forced to retire from football, following an injury sustained by Borussia Dortmund's Miroslav Votava.

References

External links 
 

1954 births
Living people
German footballers
Association football defenders
Association football midfielders
Bundesliga players
2. Bundesliga players
VfL Osnabrück players
Wuppertaler SV players
Tennis Borussia Berlin players
Hertha BSC players